United Nations Security Council resolution 768, adopted unanimously on 30 July 1992, after recalling previous resolutions on the topic including 501 (1982), 508 (1982), 509 (1982) and 520 (1982) as well as studying the report by the Secretary-General on the United Nations Interim Force in Lebanon (UNIFIL) approved in 426 (1978), the Council decided to extend the mandate of UNIFIL for a further six months until 31 January 1993.

The Council then re-emphasised the mandate of the Force and requested the Secretary-General to report back on the progress made with regard to the implementation of resolutions 425 (1978) and 426 (1978).

See also 
 Israeli–Lebanese conflict
 Lebanese Civil War
 List of United Nations Security Council Resolutions 701 to 800 (1991–1993)
 South Lebanon conflict (1985–2000)

References

External links
 
Text of the Resolution at undocs.org

 0768
 0768
Israeli–Lebanese conflict
1992 in Israel
1992 in Lebanon
Arab–Israeli peace process
 0768
July 1992 events